Pechyptila is a genus of moth in the family Cosmopterigidae. It contains only one species, Pechyptila rhodocharis, which is found in Australia.

References

External links
Natural History Museum Lepidoptera genus database

Cosmopterigidae